María Paula Porras (born 18 March 2002) is a Costa Rican footballer who plays as a forward for Deportivo Saprissa and the Costa Rica women's national team.

International goals
Scores and results list Costa Rica's goal tally first

References

2002 births
Living people
Women's association football forwards
Costa Rican women's footballers
Costa Rica women's international footballers